"No More Heroes" is a song by English rock band the Stranglers, released as a single from their studio album of the same name. It is one of the group's most successful singles (featuring regularly both in greatest hits and punk and new wave compilation albums), having peaked at No. 8 in the UK Singles Chart.

The song's lyrics refer to several historical figures, starting with the Ukrainian Marxist revolutionary Leon Trotsky who "got an ice pick / that made his ears burn".. The second verse reels off "dear old Lenny" i.e. the stand-up comedian Lenny Bruce,  "the Great Elmyra", identified by Cornwell as painter and art forger Elmyr de Hory, and the fictional character Sancho Panza from the novel Don Quixote. Then finally the playwright William Shakespeare and the emperor Nero.

At the time of the single's release, the B-side "In the Shadows" was a non-album track; however, it appeared on the Stranglers' next studio album, Black and White (1978). 

The band's publishers threatened legal action against Elastica in 1995, arguing that their single "Waking Up" borrowed elements of "No More Heroes". Elastica eventually settled out of court.

A cover version of the song by Violent Femmes featured in the movie Mystery Men (1999), and was also heard in two episodes of the BBC television series Ashes to Ashes: episode 1 of Series 1 and episode 4 of Series 3. It was included in the soundtrack to Series 1.
The song was featured on the closing credits of TV series Zapped, Season 2, Episode 6. Former Stranglers member and song co-writer Hugh Cornwell released an acoustic version of the song on his ninth solo studio album Monster (2018), along with acoustic versions of nine other Stranglers songs. It also featured in Episode 1 of Season 3 of The Umbrella Academy.

The video game series No More Heroes is named after this song and the album.

Charts

References

External links

The Stranglers songs
1977 singles
Song recordings produced by Martin Rushent
1977 songs
United Artists Records singles
Songs written by Dave Greenfield
Songs written by Hugh Cornwell
Songs written by Jean-Jacques Burnel
Songs written by Jet Black
Cultural depictions of Leon Trotsky
Songs about William Shakespeare
Songs about politicians
Songs about writers
Songs involved in plagiarism controversies